Jesús Fraile Moreno (born 8 June 1964 in Toledo) is a boccia player from Spain.  He has a physical disability: He has cerebral palsy and is a BC2 type athlete.  He competed at the 1996 Summer Paralympics.  He finished first in the BC1/BC2 team event and he finished third in the BC2 one person event.  He competed at the 2000 Summer Paralympics. He finished third in the BC2 one person event. He finished second in  the BC1/BC2 team event

References

External links 
 
 

1964 births
Living people
Spanish boccia players
Paralympic boccia players of Spain
Paralympic gold medalists for Spain
Paralympic silver medalists for Spain
Paralympic bronze medalists for Spain
Paralympic medalists in boccia
Boccia players at the 1996 Summer Paralympics
Boccia players at the 2000 Summer Paralympics
Medalists at the 1996 Summer Paralympics
Medalists at the 2000 Summer Paralympics
Sportspeople from Toledo, Spain